Santa Susanna is a municipality in the comarca of the Maresme in Catalonia, Spain. It is situated on the coast between Malgrat de Mar and Pineda de Mar. The main N-II road runs through the town.

There is train link direct from Sants station in Barcelona.

References 

 Panareda Clopés, Josep Maria; Rios Calvet, Jaume; Rabella Vives, Josep Maria (1989). Guia de Catalunya, Barcelona: Caixa de Catalunya.  (Spanish).  (Catalan).

External links 
 Official Tourism Information website
 Official website 
 Government data pages 
 Historical heritage in Santa Susanna

Municipalities in Maresme